Radovene Point (‘Nos Radovene’ \'nos ra-do-'ve-ne\) is the rocky point on the south side of the entrance to Sexaginta Prista Bay and the north side of the entrance to Domlyan Bay on Oscar II Coast in Graham Land.  It is situated at the east extremity of Stevrek Ridge, and was formed as a result of the break-up of Larsen Ice Shelf in the area, and the retreat of Mapple Glacier and Melville Glacier in the early 21st century.  The feature is named after the settlement of Radovene in Northwestern Bulgaria.

Location
SCAR Antarctic Digital Database mapping in 2012.

Maps
 Antarctic Digital Database (ADD). Scale 1:250000 topographic map of Antarctica. Scientific Committee on Antarctic Research (SCAR), 1993–2016.

References
 Radovene Point. SCAR Composite Antarctic Gazetteer.
 Bulgarian Antarctic Gazetteer. Antarctic Place-names Commission. (details in Bulgarian, basic data in English)

External links
 Radovene Point. Copernix satellite image

Headlands of Graham Land
Oscar II Coast
Bulgaria and the Antarctic